Soni Chaurasia is a Kathak dancer and skater from Varanasi, India.

Training
Soni has learnt Kathak from Pt Om Prakash Mishra and Dr Vidhi Nagar. She has also learnt skating from Rajesh Dogra.

Career
Soni created a Guinness World Record after dancing for 124 hours.

References

1983 births
Indian female dancers
Living people